Wallace Aliifua Rank (born March 1, 1958) is an American former professional basketball player.

A 6'6" guard-forward, Rank played college basketball for San Jose State University from 1977 to 1980. He scored 1,432 points in his college career and set a school record for points in a game when he tallied 40 against California State University, Sacramento on January 3, 1980.

In 1980, Rank was selected by the San Diego Clippers with the 99th pick of the 1980 NBA draft. He played 25 games for the Clippers during the 1980–81 NBA season, scoring 55 points. He later played for Sacramora Rimini in Italy and Great Taste Coffee Makers in the Philippines.

Rank is a Samoan American, and played for the Western Samoa national basketball team at the 1993 Oceania championship.

References

External links
Wally Rank profile at the National Pacific Islander Educator Network

1958 births
Living people
American expatriate basketball people in Italy
American expatriate basketball people in the Philippines
American men's basketball players
American sportspeople of Samoan descent
Basketball players from California
Basket Rimini Crabs players
People from Carson, California
People from Fort Ord, California
Philippine Basketball Association imports
Samoan men's basketball players
San Diego Clippers draft picks
San Diego Clippers players
San Jose State Spartans men's basketball players
Shooting guards
Small forwards
Great Taste Coffee Makers players